Denise Darcel ( née Billecard, 8 September 1924 – 23 December 2011) was a French-American vaudevillian, actress and singer, who from 1948 and 1963, appeared in films in Hollywood, and briefly on the stage, television and radio.

Early years
Born as Denise Billecard in Paris, she was one of five daughters of a French baker, and she was college educated, studying at the University of Dijon. According to a friend, whom she met in Paris during World War II, she was a passenger in an L-5 Stinson light observation aircraft on VJ Day to see the celebration from the air. The pilot, James Helinger Sr., a US Army Air Corps glider pilot (a friend) was at the controls, while they flew under several bridges along the Seine and finally, under the Eiffel Tower, with the crowds below.

A winner of the title "The Most Beautiful Girl in France," Darcel was a cabaret singer in Paris after World War II before being spotted by Hollywood. Denise came to the United States in 1947 and became an American citizen in 1952.

On 15 February 1952 she was named "Miss Welder of 1952" by the National Eutectic Welders' Club. Presenting her with a scroll as "the girl we would like most to weld with" was R. D. Wasserman, President of the Eutectic Welding Institute. Wasserman hoped that her photograph would inspire women throughout the nation to join the ranks of the labor force and support the war effort in Korea.

Stage
Darcel's debut on the legitimate stage came in 1950, when she appeared in Pardon Our French, premiering 5 October at the Broadway Theatre.

Vaudeville
In 1950, Darcel had a Vaudeville act, which was panned by at least one reviewer. About Darcel's performance 5 May 1950, at the Strand in New York, the Billboard review said: "Denise Darcel showed her well-stacked chassis ... but her heavily accented English sounded like so much gibberish; it got laughs instead of attention. ... her singing is inadequate, her over-use of hands and arms is clumsy and she shows herself completely at a loss in handling hecklers."

Film
Her first film appearance of note was in Battleground (1949). She made quite an impression in Tarzan and the Slave Girl (1950) opposite Lex Barker, then co-starred with Robert Taylor in Westward the Women (1952) and Glenn Ford in Young Man with Ideas (1952). In 1953, she was seen in the swimming musical Dangerous When Wet, which starred Esther Williams (1953). Her most important film was Vera Cruz (1954) where she played the female lead opposite Gary Cooper and Burt Lancaster. Her last film (1961) was Seven Women from Hell.

Television
Darcel appeared on various TV shows in the 1950s. In 1954, she was hostess/MC of Gamble on Love, a summer program on the DuMont Television Network. Darcel asked questions of married couples who sought to win the grand prize of a mink coat. A review in Billboard described her as "Gallic to the point of unintelligibility." Also in 1954, Colonel Productions produced a pilot of Chez Denise, a 30-minute "comedy-intrigue" program starring Darcel, which apparently did not sell.

Later years
After her film and television career began to wane, Darcel, aged 41, became an ecdysiast (stripper), appearing in West Coast theatres in San Francisco, Las Vegas, Oakland, and Los Angeles. She retired from stripping after a few years and returned to the cabaret circuit, making a few appearances on television. In 1991, she was cast as "Solange La Fitte" in the Los Angeles 20th anniversary revival of the musical Follies, produced by the Long Beach Civic Light Opera. She would later repeat the role of Solange in 1995 for revivals in Houston and Seattle.

Personal life
Darcel's first husband, William Shaw, was an American Army captain whom she married in 1947. Darcel obtained a Mexican divorce from Peter Crosby 12 August 1951. She married Robert Atkinson 24 April 1961. They had two sons, Christopher (born 17 November 1961) and Craig. Husband George Simpson died in 2003.

In the early 1950s, Darcel was linked romantically with singer Billy Eckstine. In 1993, Jet magazine reported, "Eckstine's hot romance with actress Denise Darcel cooled off after their photo appeared on cover of Life Magazine, causing a White backlash."

Recording
Online music store iTunes recently made Darcel's album, Banned in Boston (recorded in 1958), available for purchase alongside actress Lizabeth Scott's album, Lizabeth.

Legal problems
On 23 June 1968, Darcel was arrested in Miami, Florida, and charged with shoplifting women's undergarments valued at $38.94 ($ today). She was released on $500 bond. She was found guilty and fined $300 ($ today) in a trial 10 July 1968.

Darcel and her husband, Robert Gerard Atkinson, filed bankruptcy petitions in San Bernardino, California, in 1963. The petitions listed "total assets of $1,508 ($ today) and individual and joint debts of $88,904 for her and $62,223 for him."(total of $ today)

Honors
In September 2009, she was honored with the Cinecon Career Achievement Award, presented in Hollywood at a banquet held at the Hollywood Renaissance Hotel. Prior to the ceremony, a new 35mm color print of her 1953 film, Flame of Calcutta, was screened at the Egyptian Theatre. After the screening, at the banquet, she cheerfully announced to the audience, "I'm back".

The world's oldest drag queen, Walter W. Cole took the stage name of Darcelle XV, in honor of Denise Darcel.

Death
Darcel died in December 2011, aged 87, after emergency surgery to repair a ruptured aneurysm.

Selected filmography
To the Victor (1948) as Bar Singer (uncredited)
Thunder in the Pines (1948) as Yvette Cheron
Battleground (1949) as Denise
Tarzan and the Slave Girl (1950) as Lola
Westward the Women (1951) as Fifi Danon
Young Man with Ideas (1952) as Dorianne Gray
Dangerous When Wet (1953) as Gigi Mignon
Flame of Calcutta (1953) as Suzanne Roget 
Vera Cruz (1954) as Countess Marie Duvarre
Gamble on Love (DuMont game show, 1954; replaced by Ernie Kovacs) as Countess Marie Duvarre
The Milton Berle Show (1956, TV Series)
Tightrope! (1960, TV Series) as Terri
Seven Women from Hell (1961) as Claire Oudry
Naked City (1962, TV Series) as Madeleine Douvay
Combat! (1963, TV Series) as Annette (final appearance)

Radio appearances

Television appearances

1963    Combat                   Season2 Episode10

Notes

External links

 
 
 Photographs of Denise Darcel

1924 births
2011 deaths
Actresses from Paris
American women singers
American film actresses
American musical theatre actresses
American television actresses
Cabaret singers
Deaths from aneurysm
French emigrants to the United States
French women singers
French film actresses
French musical theatre actresses
Torch singers
21st-century American women